Guido Ascanio Sforza di Santa Fiora (26 November 1518 – 6 October 1564) was an Italian cardinal, known also as The cardinal of Santa Fiora.

Born in Rome, he was the son of Costanza Farnese and therefore grandson of Pope Paul III, brother of Cardinal Alessandro Sforza (1565), uncle of Cardinal Francesco Sforza and great-uncle of Cardinal Federico Sforza (1645). During his time as a cardinal he served as legate as well as administrator of different towns and episcopal sees.

His ecclesiastical career started very early with his selection as Bishop of Montefiascone e Corneto, nowadays Diocese of Viterbo, Acquapendente, Bagnoregio, Montefiascone, Tuscania e San Martino al Monte Cimino on 12 November 1528 when he was not quite ten years of age. He resigned on 4 June 1548.

He was created a cardinal deacon in the consistory of 18 December 1534 by Pope Paul III with the Deaconry of Santi Vito, Modesto e Crescenzia. Later he was appointed Camerlengo of the Holy Roman Church on 22 October 1537, a position he held until his death. He was opted for the Deaconry of Santa Maria in Cosmedin on 31 May 1540, for the Deaconry of Sant'Eustachio on 10 December 1540 and finally for the Deaconry of Santa Maria in Via Lata on 9 March 1552. He participated in the two papal conclaves of 1555 (the one in April which elected Marcellus II and that in May which chose Paul IV) as well as the conclave held in December 1559, which resulted in the election of Pius IV who re-convoked the Council of Trent.

Guido Ascanio Sforza died on 6 October 1564 of fever in Mantua. His body was transferred to Rome and buried in his family's chapel in the patriarchal Liberian basilica.

References

Sources
 Tha Cardinals of the Holy Roman Church - Biographical dictionary
 * 

1518 births
1564 deaths
Clergy from Rome
16th-century Italian cardinals
Cardinal-nephews
16th-century Italian Roman Catholic bishops
Bishops of Lodève
Bishops of Montefiascone
Bishops of Parma
Guido Ascanio Sforza di Santa Fiora
Camerlengos of the Holy Roman Church